Antoni Bazaniak (1 May 1916 in Hamborn, Germany – 12 March 1979 in Marino, Italy) was a Polish sprint canoeist who competed in the 1930s.

He finished 11h in the K-2 10000 m event at the 1936 Summer Olympics in Berlin.

References
 Sports-reference.com profile

1916 births
1979 deaths
Burials at Powązki Military Cemetery
Canoeists at the 1936 Summer Olympics
Olympic canoeists of Poland
Polish male canoeists
Sportspeople from Duisburg
German emigrants to Poland